Taking Flight is the fourth studio album by Filipino singer Sarah Geronimo, released on July 25, 2007 under VIVA Records. The album showcases songs by Filipino composers Louie Ocampo, Trina Belamide, Chuckie Dreyfus, Rebel Magdagasang and Medwin Marfil. To date, all its editions have sold more than 30,000 copies in the Philippines, certifying Platinum by the Philippine Association of the Record Industry.

Singles
The carrier single of the album, I'll Be Alright, was written by Louie Ocampo who, was also the musical director of her sold-out concert In Motion at the Araneta Coliseum. It went gold in four months and sold more than 15,000 units, after she released her second single, Ikaw. It was written by True Faith's frontman, Medwin Marfil, and later topped the charts for months. On February 2008, the album was already certified platinum, with sales of 30,000 units. The album was re-released with the cover single, Very Special Love, as a bonus track from her top-grossing film, A Very Special Love with John Lloyd Cruz. The third single released from the album is Kahit Na. The song was composed by singer- songwriter Chuckie Dreyfus. The last single from the album is I'll Be Here written by Rebel Magdasang.

Track listing

Personnel
Credits were taken from Titik Pilipino.

 Alwyn Cruz - producer, vocal supervision
 Apol Gonzaga - background vocals
 Baby Gil - producer
 Bleps Carlos - concept and denim
 Eric Payumo - recording, mixing, mastering
 Fara Manuel - concept and denim
 Francis Dayao - logistics
 Guia G. Ferrer - A&R management
 Janet dela Fuente - stylist
 Juan Sarte - hair and make-up
 Juarde Herradura - background vocals
 Jun Tamayo  - arranger
 Louie Ocampo - arranger
 Mark Nicdao - photography

 Marvin Querido - arranger
 MG Mozo - supervising producer
 Mia Marigomen - concept and denim
 Mon Faustino - arranger
 Nino Regalado - arranger
 Paul Alexei Basinillo - creative director
 Ralph Hilaga - logistics
 Rebel Magdagasang - arranger
 Riva Ferrer - background vocals, background vocals arranger
 RS Francisco - acting coach
 Sarah Geronimo - lead vocals
 Vic del Rosario, Jr. - executive producer
 Vincent del Rosario - executive producer

Certifications

Release history

References

2007 albums
Sarah Geronimo albums
Viva Records (Philippines) albums